is a passenger railway station in the city of Sakura, Chiba Prefecture, Japan, operated by the private railway operator Keisei Electric Railway.

Lines
Shizu Station is served by the Keisei Main Line, and lies 42.1 kilometers from the Tokyo terminus of the line at Keisei-Ueno Station.

Station layout
Shizu Station has two opposed side platforms connected by underpasses to a station building underneath.

Platforms

History
Shizu Station was opened on March 18, 1928. The station was rebuilt as an elevated station in 1981.

Station numbering was introduced to all Keisei Line stations on 17 July 2010. Shizu Station was assigned station number KS32.

Passenger statistics
In fiscal 2019, the station was used by an average of 15,716 passengers daily.

Surrounding area
 Sakura City Shizu Junior High School
 Sakura Shizu Post Office

See also
 List of railway stations in Japan

References

External links

  Keisei Station layout

Railway stations in Japan opened in 1928
Railway stations in Chiba Prefecture
Keisei Main Line
Sakura, Chiba